Odette Nyiramilimo (born 1956) is a Rwandan physician and senator.  She served as Minister of State for Social Affairs in the government of Paul Kagame from March 2000 to October 2003.

Background 
Nyiramilimo, an ethnic Tutsi, was born in Kinunu, Gisenyi prefecture in 1956. She is seventeenth of her father's eighteen children, born to his second wife.

Education 
In 1981 she graduated as a medical doctor from the National University of Rwanda in Butare.

Personal life 
At age three many members of her family were killed in the power struggles following independence.  She experienced an eventful childhood, including expulsion from school because she was Tutsi.

She later married Jean-Baptiste Gasasira, also a physician, and the two later founded a private maternity and pediatrics practice in Kigali called Le Bon Samaritain ("Good Samaritan")

Her life story was profiled at length in Philip Gourevitch's book We Wish to Inform You That Tomorrow We Will Be Killed With Our Families.

She has 3 children; Clement Uwajeneza (born 1980), Ariane Inkesha (born 1982) and Patrick Cyusa Kinyange (born 1987)

Career 
She worked in Kibuye hospital

She served as Minister of State for Social Affairs in the government of Rwanda from March 2000 to October 2003.

References

External links 
Frontline: The Triumph of Evil, Excerpt of program mentioning Nyiramilimo extensively

Rwandan physicians
People from Western Province, Rwanda
Social affairs ministers of Rwanda
Tutsi people
Members of the Senate (Rwanda)
Women government ministers of Rwanda
20th-century Rwandan women politicians
20th-century Rwandan politicians
21st-century Rwandan women politicians
21st-century Rwandan politicians
1956 births
Living people